Jürg Ott is Emeritus Professor of statistical genetics at Rockefeller University, New York.

Awards
In 2008, Ott received the Ming Tsuang Lifetime Achievement Award Lifetime Achievement Award from the International Society of Psychiatric Genetics. In 2010 he won the William Allan Award at the American Society of Human Genetics.

Bibliography

References

20th-century Swiss scientists
20th-century biologists
21st-century Swiss scientists
21st-century biologists
Swiss biologists
Statistical geneticists
Swiss emigrants to the United States